The Toronto Book Awards are Canadian literary awards, presented annually by the City of Toronto government to the author of the year's best fiction or non-fiction book or books "that are evocative of Toronto". The award is presented in the fall of each year, with its advance promotional efforts including a series of readings by the nominated authors at each year's The Word on the Street festival.

Each author shortlisted for the award receives $1,000, and the winner or winners receive the balance of $15,000.

The award has frequently gone to multiple winners. 1987 was the first time in the history of the award that only a single winner was named.

Winners and nominees

1970s

1980s

1990s

2000s

2010s

2020s

References

External links
 Toronto Book Awards (City of Toronto Web site)

Canadian non-fiction literary awards
Culture of Toronto
Awards established in 1974
1974 establishments in Ontario
Canadian fiction awards